William, Willie, Billy, Bill, or Will McFarland or MacFarland may refer to:

Musicians
Bill McFarland, American trombonist who played for Southside Movement in 1973–75
Will McFarland, American guitarist on 1979's Dream Master (album)#Credits and personnel

Politicians
William Hamilton MacFarland (1799–1872), American legislator from Virginia
William McFarland (Tennessee politician) (1821–1900), American politician from Tennessee
William M. McFarland (1848–1905), American politician from Iowa
William McFarland, Canadian alderman who won in 1935 Hamilton, Ontario municipal election#Aldermen

Sports figures
Bill MacFarland (1932–2011), Canadian-born American ice hockey player
Bill McFarland, American football player on 1961 Oklahoma State Cowboys football team
Willie McFarland, British jockey; 1990 winner of Adonis Juvenile Novices' Hurdle#Winners

Others
Billy McFarland (loyalist), Northern Irish paramilitary, also known as "The Mexican"
Billy McFarland (fraudster) (born 1991), American convicted felon

See also
William McFarlane (disambiguation)
William McFarland House, American historic house in Massachusetts